Popa Game Park is a game park in Namibia, around the series of cascading rapids known as Popa Falls in the Okavango River, where the river crosses the Caprivi Strip in Kavango East, between Divundu and Bagani. During low water one can see that the difference of elevation is ca. 4 meters.

The game park, which measures 0.25 km², was founded in 1989. It contains hippos, crocodiles and 417 bird species. The vegetation is lush savannah vegetation.

Suggested activities include hiking, angling and bird watching. Swimming is not an option due to the crocodiles.

Mahango Game Park is located nearby, at a distance of 14 km.

References
 

National parks of Namibia
Protected areas established in 1989